Papagiannis is a Greek surname. It can refer to:

Georgios Papagiannis (born 1997), Greek basketball player 
Manthos Papagiannis, 16th century Greek noble and revolutionary
Theodoros Papagiannis (born 1942), Greek sculptor

Greek-language surnames
Surnames